Saint-Anselme is a village in the Bellechasse Regional County Municipality, part of the Chaudière-Appalaches administrative region. It is the second biggest municipality in the RCM, after Saint-Henri. The Etchemin River goes through the village.

Personalities 
Georges Dumont (Saint-Anselme, 1898 - Moncton, 1966), medical doctor and politician
Louis-Napoléon Larochelle (1834-1890), manufacturer, railway contractor and politician

References

Municipalities in Quebec
Incorporated places in Chaudière-Appalaches
Canada geography articles needing translation from French Wikipedia